Sudan is one of the first countries to participate in the Africa Cup of Nations, and was also the first host country, when Sudan hosted it in 1957. During 1950s to 1970s, Sudan was one of Africa's best teams, and had won the tournament in the 1970 also held at home just after Gaafar Nimeiry's coup, with its greatest striker being Mustafa Azhari Alawad. However, after 1970, with Mustafa's retirement, the Sudanese team began to suffer a long decline and Sudan would lose status as a major African power to the hand of other African teams. Overall, Sudan had to wait for 32 years after qualified to the 1976 Africa Cup of Nations to make its return in the 2008 Africa Cup of Nations, where it finished bottom with three straight 0–3 loss. Sudan would soon manage its best performance up to date in 2012 Africa Cup of Nations, reaching the quarter-finals in modern era, before suffers tremendous crisis that continue to hinder the growth of Sudanese football.

Overall record

Squads

Tournaments

References

External links
Africa Cup of Nations – Archives competitions – cafonline.com

Sudan national football team
Countries at the Africa Cup of Nations